Elisa, vida mía is a 1977 Spanish drama film written and directed  by Carlos Saura. The film stars Saura's long-term companion and frequent collaborator, Geraldine Chaplin. She stars alongside Fernando Rey who won the Best Actor award at the 1977 Cannes Film Festival for his performance.

Plot
On a secluded farmhouse in Castile and León, Luis is reunited with his estranged daughter, Elisa after a 20-year separation. On the farmhouse, Luis writes what appears at times to be both an autobiography and a novel. The book is played out, with memories of the past, such as when Luis walked out on his family and is mixed with fantasies about Elisa's adult life as well as her failed marriage.<ref name=nyt>Canby, Vincent. Film: "Elisa, Vida Mia", pp. 8. The New York Times. 11 March 1983. Retrieved on 30 July 2011</ref>

Cast
 Geraldine Chaplin as Elisa Santamaria/mother of Elisa
 Fernando Rey as Luis
 Ana Torrent as Elisa as child
 Norman Briski as Antonio
 Arantxa Escamilla as Niña Isabel
 Jacobo Escamillaa as Niño
 Francisco Guijar as Médico
 Joaquín Hinojosa as Julián
 Isabel Mestres

Reception
Vincent Canby of The New York Times'' praised Chaplin and Rey; "The main reasons to see the film are the two leading performances. Mr. Rey is always an interesting presence, and Miss. Chaplin as in all of her Saura films, reveals qualities of feeling, control and beauty that no other directors have ever found."

Saura was nominated for the Palme d'Or for the film, and won Best Director at Spain's Cinema Writers Circle Awards.

References

External links 
 
 
 

1977 films
1970s Spanish-language films
1977 drama films
Spain in fiction
Films directed by Carlos Saura
Spanish drama films
1970s Spanish films